Anglicans for Life (AFL) is the anti-abortion ministry of the Anglican Church in North America and internationally associated with some members of the Anglican Communion, specifically of GAFCON. AFL educates and provides pastoral resources on the right to life position on the issues of abortion, assisted suicide, elderly care, cloning and embryonic stem cell research. AFL also educates and provides pastoral resources on abstinence and adoption. The organization has volunteer Life Leaders in more than 100 parishes in the United States, Canada, Kenya and Uganda. AFL also has the support of the American Anglican Council and of several "life-affirming churches" of the Episcopal Church of the United States. Anglicans for Life Canada is affiliated with the Anglican Network in Canada, a diocese of the Anglican Church in North America, being officially launched at 7 May 2014 in a seminar held at St. Peter and St. Paul's Anglican Church in Ottawa. The current president is Georgette Forney. The first director is Vicky Hedelius.

History
The Episcopal Church was historically anti-abortion. In 1958, it still held that "Abortion and infanticide are to be condemned." In 1966 Joseph M. Harte, bishop of the Episcopal Diocese of Arizona founded Episcopalians for Life, which was officially incorporated in 1983 as the National Organization of Episcopalians for Life Research and Education Foundation (NOEL). 

From 1983 to 1996 NOEL operated from Fairfax, Virginia. It published newsletters and educational resources to present their anti-abortion concerns. NOEL's ministry reached nationwide, ministering to women in unplanned pregnancies, educating Episcopalians about abortion, and working to influence the church by introducing anti-abortion resolutions at General Conventions. In 1988, the 69th General Convention of the Episcopal Church adopted a resolution that stated: "All human life is sacred. Hence it is sacred from its inception until death." The statement went on to call for church programs to assist women with problem pregnancies and to emphasize the seriousness of the abortion decision.

In 1994, the Episcopal Church was the first church member of the Anglican Communion to fully support legal abortion at the 71st General Convention, expressing its "unequivocal opposition to any... action... that [would] abridge the right of a woman to reach an informed decision about the termination of her pregnancy, or that would limit the access of a woman to a safe means of acting upon her decision."

In 1996 the NOEL headquarters moved from Virginia to Sewickley, Pennsylvania. In 1998 the board appointed Georgette Forney as the fifth president of NOEL, a position formerly named "executive secretary" and "executive director".

NOEL changed its name to Anglicans For Life in 2006 as its ministry expanded to the wider Anglican Communion. In the US, AFL works with parishes of the Episcopal Church, ACNA, and other Continuing Anglican groups.

Campaigns
In conjunction with Priests for Life, Anglicans for Life (then NOEL) launched the Silent No More campaign in 2003 in an effort to further educate the general public about abortion and other related issues. Silent No More is a ministry started by post-abortive women and men with the intention of reaching out to other post-abortive people. The Campaign allowed AFL to network and partner with other anti-abortion organizations in the United States. In 2010, AFL launched the "Anglican Angel Ministry" to raise awareness about the need to help pregnant women and to provide a parish-based support system for single mothers. The Silent No More campaign has 80 Regional Coordinators worldwide, in the United States, Canada, Ireland, Scotland, France, Netherlands, Czech Republic, Spain, Australia and Uganda.

See also

Abortion debate
Joanna Jepson
Right to life
Silent No More

References

External links
 Official homepage

American Christian political organizations
Anglican Church in North America
Anglican organizations
Christian organizations established in the 20th century
Anti-abortion organizations in the United States